White Sands Test Facility (WSTF) is a U.S. government rocket engine test facility and a resource for testing and evaluating potentially hazardous materials, space flight components, and rocket propulsion systems. NASA established WSTF on the White Sands Missile Range in 1963. WSTF services are available to NASA, the United States Department of Defense, other federal agencies, universities and commercial industry. WSTF is managed by the Lyndon B. Johnson Space Center. WSTF is located in the western foothills of the Organ Mountains, eleven miles east of Las Cruces, New Mexico.

Activities and facilities

Rocket propulsion
The primary mission of WSTF is to support NASA's Space Station program, and previously the Space Shuttle. As the official Johnson Space Center (JSC) Propulsion Systems Development Facility, WSTF participates in propulsion systems testing, with test expertise in hypergolic and mono-propellant handling and training.  During the orbiter's life WSTF also managed and operated the Shuttle Fleet Leader program which consisted of testing orbital maneuvering and reaction control (thruster) subsystems.WSTF Propulsion

White Sands Test Facility offers numerous ambient pressure and altitude simulation stands to test rocket propulsion test systems as well as single rocket engines.
 Ambient Testing
 Fleet Leader Testing
 Unique Propulsion Test Expertise

Laboratories
WSTF performs testing designed to better understand materials used in space flight.
WSTF Laboratories
 Oxygen Systems
 Propellant Systems
 Hypervelocity Impact Testing
 Composite Overwrapped Pressure Vessels (COPV)
 Standard Materials Testing

Hardware processing
The mission of the Hardware Processing Office is to provide the expertise to develop ground support equipment with the highest regard for safety and customer satisfaction.  WSTF Hardware Processing
 Flight and Critical Hardware and Depot Processing
 Component Services
 Fabrication Services
 Measurement Standards and Calibration Laboratory
 Photo / Video Services
 Technical Publication Services

White Sands Space Harbor
WSTF formerly operated the White Sands Space Harbor (WSSH), which was the primary training area for Space Shuttle pilots, before the WSSH was closed in the wake of the Space Shuttle retirement. WSSH

Chemical and physical properties of materials
The engineers, chemists, and scientists in WSTF laboratories conduct testing of hazardous materials and propellants, air quality, aerospace hardware and ground support equipment, and all materials used in space flight. Standard Testing for DOT, ASTM and NASA, as well as ignition and flammability testing is routinely performed.

Hazards assessment
WSTF laboratory facilities conduct hazardous fluid assessment, hypervelocity tests, and explosive hazard assessment. The High Energy Blast Facility performs explosive testing with solid, cryogenic, hypergolic propellants, and other high explosives.

Oxygen systems
Oxygen compatibility is a critical issue in space, aircraft, medical, and industrial applications. At WSTF, researchers investigate the effects of increased oxygen concentration on the ignition and burning of materials and components used in these applications. Hazards analyses are performed on materials, components, and systems; and failure analyses determine the cause of fires. Training courses about design and operation of safe oxygen systems are provided by WSTF personnel under the auspices of ASTM.  WSTF NASA Oxygen Systems

Space flight hardware
The Propulsion Component Test Facility at WSTF is an International Space Station Depot Repair Facility.  Flight hardware assembly, repair, and acceptance testing for private aerospace manufacturers is performed. WSTF refurbished hypergolic propellant components for the Space Shuttle, performed advanced pyrovalve testing at two laboratory facilities, and performed failure investigations.  WSTF NASA Hardware Processing

Health, safety, and environmental impact
Since the late 1990s, NASA and a series of subcontractors have been working under the oversight of the New Mexico Environment Department to remediate a large plume of polluted ground water caused by repeated leaks and spills of cleaning fluids and rocket propellants at the site. Remediation has involved the construction of six wells from which the groundwater is pumped; a UV reactor which treats the contaminated water; and four injection wells to inject the cleaned water back into the water table. A second, similar system is currently in the planning stage.

Notes

References 

Johnson Space Center
Buildings and structures in Doña Ana County, New Mexico
Tularosa Basin
Space technology research institutes
Aerospace research institutes
Aviation research institutes
1963 establishments in New Mexico